Sonorama 2013, or Sonorama Ribera 2013, was the 16th edition of the Sonorama Music Festival. It took place in Aranda de Duero in Castile and León (Spain) in mid-August. It was organized by the non-profit cultural association "Art de Troya". The four-day music festival had an expected participation of 40,000 spectators.

International bands 
 Travis
 Belle and Sebastian

Spanish bands

See also 
 Sonorama
 Music of Spain

References

External links
 Festival Sonorama Ribera Official website.
 Facebook Fan page
 Twitter Fan page

Music festivals in Spain
2013 in Castile and León